This is a list of important and seminal works in the field of critical theory.

 Otto Maria Carpeaux
 História da Literatura Ocidental, 8 vol. (Portuguese, 1959–66)
 M. H. Abrams
 The Mirror and the Lamp: Romantic Theory and the Critical Tradition
Angela Davis
Women, Race, and Class 
Are Prison's Obsolete?
 Theodor Adorno
 Aesthetic Theory
 Negative Dialectics
 Theodor Adorno & Max Horkheimer
 Dialectic of Enlightenment
 Louis Althusser
 For Marx
 Lenin and Philosophy
 Erich Auerbach
 Mimesis: The Representation of Reality in Western Literature
 Mikhail Bakhtin
 Discourse in the Novel
 Rabelais and his World
 Roland Barthes
 Image, Music, Text
 Mkk
 Jean Baudrillard
The Perfect Crime
 Simulation and Simulacra
 Walter Benjamin
 Illuminations
 The Origin of German Tragic Drama
 Homi K. Bhabha
 The Location of Culture
 Pierre Bourdieu
 La distinction
 Kenneth Burke
 A Rhetoric of Motives
 A Grammar of Motives
 John Brannigan
 New Historicism and Cultural Materialism
 Cleanth Brooks
 The Well Wrought Urn: Studies in the Structure of Poetry
 Sean Burke
 The Death and Return of the Author
 Judith Butler
 Bodies That Matter
 Gender Trouble: Feminism and the Subversion of Identity
 Cathy Caruth
 Unclaimed Experience: Trauma, Narrative and History
 Samuel Taylor Coleridge
Biographia Literaria
 Jonathan Culler
 Structuralist Poetics
 The Pursuit of Signs
 Literary Theory: A Very Short Introduction
 Gilles Deleuze
 Difference and Repetition
 Gilles Deleuze and Félix Guattari
 Capitalism and Schizophrenia: Anti-Oedipus (pt.1) and A Thousand Plateaus (pt.2)
 Jacques Derrida
 Of Grammatology
 Writing and Difference
 Peter Dews
 The Limits of Disenchantment
 The Logic of Disintigration
 Terry Eagleton
 Marxism and Literary Criticism
 The Idea of Culture
 Antony Easthope
 The Unconscious
William Empson
 Seven Types of Ambiguity
 Some Versions of Pastoral
 The Structure of Complex Words
Norman Fairclough
Language and Power
Critical Discourse Analysis
 Frantz Fanon
 Black Skins, White Masks
 Stanley Fish
 Is There a Text in this Class?
 Northrop Frye
 Anatomy of Criticism
 Gerald Graff
 Literature Against Itself
 Jürgen Habermas
 Legitimation Crisis
 The Theory of Communicative Action, volumes 1 & 2
 The Philosophical Discourse of Modernity Wolfgang Iser
 The Act of Reading: a Theory of Aesthetic Response Leonard Jackson
 The Poverty of Structuralism Fredric Jameson
 The Political Unconscious Postmodernism, or, the Cultural Logic of Late Capitalism The Prison-House of Language Frank Kermode
 Romantic Image Julia Kristeva
 Desire in Language Powers of Horror Jacques Lacan
 Ecrits The Seminars
 F.R. Leavis
 The Great Tradition Ania Loomba
 Colonialism/Postcolonialism Herbert Marcuse
 Reason and Revolution. Hegel and the Rise of Social Theory Eros and Civilization Soviet Marxism. A Critical Analysis One-Dimensional Man Toril Moi
 Sexual/Textual Politics I.A. Richards
 Practical Criticism: A Study of Literary Judgement Principles of Literary Criticism K.K. Ruthven
 Critical Assumptions Edward Said
 Culture and Imperialism Orientalism (1978)
 Jean-Paul Sartre
 What Is Literature? (1947)
 Ferdinand de Saussure
 Cours de linguistique générale (posthumously 1916)
 Alfred Schmidt
 The Concept of Nature in Marx (1962)
 Zur Idee der Kritischen Theorie (German, 1974)
 Eve Kosofsky Sedgwick
 Between Men Epistemology of the Closet Susan Sontag
 Against Interpretation Styles of Radical Will Under the Sign of Saturn Where The Stress Falls Gayatri Chakravorty Spivak
 "Can the Subaltern Speak?"
 In Other Worlds Raymond Tallis
 Not Saussure Scott Wilson
 Cultural Materialism W.K. Wimsatt
 The Verbal Icon Virginia Woolf
 A Room of One's Own Slavoj Žižek
 The Sublime Object of Ideology The Ticklish Subject: The Absent Centre of Political OntologySee also

 List of critical theorists
 Outline of critical theory
 Pedagogy of the Oppressed'' (1968)

Critical theory
Philosophical literature
Philosophy bibliographies